Kutacane is a town in Aceh province of Indonesia and it is the seat (capital) of Southeast Aceh Regency, Indonesia. Kutacane is known as the main gate to the Gunung Leuser National Park.

Susi Air and NBA flies to Kutacane Airport from Medan and Banda Aceh.

Climate
Kutacane has a tropical rainforest climate (Af) with heavy rainfall year-round.

See also 
Alas people

References 

Populated places in Aceh
Regency seats of Aceh